Theo Bult is a Dutch former Grand Prix motorcycle road racer from Lonneker, Netherlands. He had his best year in 1971 when he finished the season in fourth place in the 350cc world championship.

Motorcycle Grand Prix results

Points system from 1950 to 1968:

Points system from 1969 onwards:

(key) (Races in bold indicate pole position; races in italics indicate fastest lap)

References 

Year of birth missing (living people)
Living people
Dutch motorcycle racers
250cc World Championship riders
350cc World Championship riders
Sportspeople from Enschede